The Voice Israel (Season 4)  is the fourth season of the reality show The Voice Israel, which focuses on finding the next Israeli pop star. It is hosted by Michael Aloni and Shlomit Malka with coaches Shlomi Shabat, Miri Mesika, Aviv Geffen and Avraham Tal. Sapir Saban is the winner.

External links
 The Voice Israel Official website

The Voice Israel seasons
2016 Israeli television seasons
2017 Israeli television seasons